Las Cruces (Spanish for "The Crosses") is an unincorporated community in Santa Barbara County, California. It lies at the split between California State Route 1, which travels north to Lompoc, and U.S. Route 101, which travels north to Buellton. The two routes coincide on the highway to the south through the Gaviota Gorge to the Gaviota Coast. The community lies within area code 805.

The spot has long been a crossroads for travellers along the Central Coast.

References

Unincorporated communities in Santa Barbara County, California
Unincorporated communities in California